Anna Maria Sforza (21 July 1476 – 30 November 1497) was Hereditary Princess of Ferrara as the first wife of Alfonso I d'Este, future Duke of Ferrara. She was the second legitimate daughter of Galeazzo Maria Sforza, Duke of Milan, and his second wife, Bona of Savoy.

Life
Born in Milan, she was the second daughter and last legitimate child of Galeazzo Maria Sforza, Duke of Milan, by his second wife, Bona of Savoy. Anna's paternal grandparents were Francesco I Sforza and Bianca Maria Visconti, for whom she was named. She had two older brothers: Gian Galeazzo Sforza and Hermes Maria Sforza, Marquis of Tortona, and a sister, Bianca Maria Sforza, second wife of Maximilian I, Holy Roman Emperor.

When Anna was five months old, her father was assassinated inside the Church of Santo Stefano in Milan on 26 December 1476, which was the Feast Day of St. Stephen. He was stabbed to death by three high-ranking officials of the Milanese court.

In 1477, Anna was formally betrothed to Alfonso I d'Este, the heir of Ercole I d'Este, Duke of Ferrara. Her wedding with Prince Alfonso d'Este took place fourteen years later, on 12 January 1491, amidst banquets, receptions, and theatrical representations. However, the marriage was unhappy: blonde and without femininity, Anna, all her time dressed like a man, refused to consummate her union, preferred the company of women and spent every night with a small black slave.

Only after six years of marriage, Anna finally became pregnant, but died in childbirth; while some sources reported that her child, a son, died immediately after being baptized; others, said that he survived and was named Alessandro, dying in 1514 aged 17. She was buried in the monastery of San Vito, of which Anna was a benefactor. Her husband was unable to take part of her funeral because at that time his face was disfigured as a consequence of syphilis.

Her death marked the end of the bond between the Sforza and Este families. Alfonso remarried, to Lucrezia Borgia, in 1502.

References

External links
A number of portraits.

1476 births
1497 deaths
15th-century Italian women
Nobility from Milan
Anna
House of Este
Deaths in childbirth
Cross-dressers
Medieval LGBT people